Joseph Marshall (years of birth and death are unknown) — British traveler of 2nd half of the 18th century. He is the author of "Travels in Holland, Flanders, Germany, of Denmark, Sweden, Lapland, Russia, Ukraine and Poland" (v. 1-3, 1772).

In 1770 he traveled the route Starodub — Chernigiv — Kiev — Ochakov. In his work he described the natural wealth of Ukraine, stressed the high level of farming Ukrainian peasants and paid much attention to the possibility of increasing imports to England from the Ukraine hemp and flax.

Works  
 Joseph Marshall (1773), Travels through Holland, Flanders, Germany, Denmark, Sweden, Lapland, Russia, the Ukraine & Poland in the years 1768, 1769, & 1770 (2nd ed.), London: Printed for J. Almon.   
 Travels through France and Spain, in the years 1770 and 1771 : In which is particularly minuted, the present state of those countries, respecting the agriculture, population. By Marshall, Joseph, fl. 1770 Corrall, George, Published 1776.

Bibliography     
 Маршалл (Marshall) Джозеф. // Українська радянська енциклопедія : у 12 т. / за ред. М. Бажана. — 2-ге вид. — Київ: Гол. редакція УРЕ, 1974–1985. — Т. 6. — 1982.   
 Україна в англійських джерелах. // Брицький П. П., Бочан П. О. Німці, французи і англійці про Україну та український народ у XVII–XIX століттях. — Чернівці: Технодрук, 2011. — С. 232–239.  (Ukraine in English sources) 

British explorers